Solomon Bozeman (born December 18, 1987) is an American former professional basketball player and current head coach for the University of Arkansas at Pine Bluff.  He played college basketball for the University of Arkansas at Little Rock.

High school career
Bozeman, son of a college coach, starred at Oxford High School in Oxford, Mississippi for three years as his father served as an assistant at Ole Miss.  In 2005, his father was named the head coach at Southern Arkansas University and Solomon played his senior season at Magnolia High School in Magnolia, Arkansas.  In his senior season, he averaged 28.5 points per game and led the school to the Arkansas state championship game.

College career
Out of high school, Bozeman signed with South Florida.  As a freshman in the 2006–07 season, he averaged 9.6 points and 3.5 assists in 30.6 minutes per game.  In his sophomore season, Bozeman saw a coaching change and also saw his minutes per game drop.  At the conclusion of the season, he decided to transfer to Arkansas–Little Rock (UALR).

At UALR, Bozeman was a two-year starter.  As a senior in 2010–11, Bozeman averaged 16.6 points per game and led the Trojans to their first NCAA tournament bid in 21 years.  UALR defeated North Texas in the Sun Belt Conference tournament championship.  Bozeman scored 20 points  in the final, including the game-winner, and was named Most Valuable Player of the tournament.  For the regular season, he was named the Sun Belt Conference Player of the Year and an honorable mention All-American by the Associated Press.

Professional career
After his college career, Bozeman was not selected in the 2011 NBA draft, but he was taken in the fifth round of the 2011 NBA Development League Draft by the Austin Toros.  He started his professional career in Austin, averaging 8 points per game in 12 contests.  He spent the rest of the season moving between teams in the Republic of Macedonia, Estonia and Israel.  Bozeman returned to the D-League's Texas Legends.  He averaged 8.4 points per game for the 2012–13 season.

For the 2013–14 season, Bozeman signed with Kryvbas of the Ukrainian SuperLeague. In January 2014, he was waived by Kryvbas.

Coaching career
In June 2014, Bozeman was hired as an assistant coach at Abilene Christian under former Little Rock assistant coach Joe Golding.

On April 19, 2016, Bozeman returned to Little Rock as an assistant coach under new head coach Wes Flanigan.

Bozeman was named head coach of Arkansas–Pine Bluff on June 11, 2021.

References

External links
 D-League stats
 Little Rock Trojans bio

1987 births
Living people
Abilene Christian Wildcats men's basketball coaches
American expatriate basketball people in Estonia
American expatriate basketball people in Israel
American expatriate basketball people in North Macedonia
American expatriate basketball people in Qatar
American expatriate basketball people in Ukraine
American men's basketball coaches
American men's basketball players
Arkansas–Pine Bluff Golden Lions men's basketball coaches
Austin Toros players
Basketball coaches from Arkansas
Basketball players from Arkansas
BC Kalev/Cramo players
College men's basketball head coaches in the United States
Little Rock Trojans men's basketball coaches
Little Rock Trojans men's basketball players
Oral Roberts Golden Eagles men's basketball coaches
Point guards
South Florida Bulls men's basketball players
Sportspeople from Little Rock, Arkansas
Texas Legends players